Leszek Murzyn (15 November 1960 – 13 December 2021) was a Polish politician.

Career
He was elected to the Sejm on 25 September 2005, getting 7220 votes in 12 Chrzanów district as a candidate from the League of Polish Families list. He was also a member of Sejm 2001-2005.

Murzyn died on 13 December 2021, at the age of 61.

See also
 Members of Polish Sejm 2005-2007

References

External links
 Leszek Murzyn - parliamentary page - includes declarations of interest, voting record, and transcripts of speeches.

1960 births
2021 deaths
Members of the Polish Sejm 2005–2007
Members of the Polish Sejm 2001–2005
League of Polish Families politicians
People from Myślenice County
Polish schoolteachers
Kukiz'15 politicians
Polish People's Party politicians